Phthalazine, also called benzo-orthodiazine or benzopyridazine, is a heterocyclic organic compound with the molecular formula C8H6N2. It is isomeric with other naphthyridines including quinoxaline, cinnoline and quinazoline.

Synthesis
Phthalazine can be obtained by the condensation of w-tetrabromorthoxylene with hydrazine, or by the reduction of chlorphthalazine with phosphorus and hydroiodic acid.

Properties
It possesses basic properties and forms addition products with alkyl iodides.

Reactions
Upon oxidation with alkaline potassium permanganate it yields pyridazine dicarboxylic acid. Zinc and hydrochloric acid decompose it with formation of orthoxylylene diamine. The keto-hydro derivative phthalazone (C8H6ON2), is obtained by condensing hydrazine with orthophthalaldehydoacid. On treatment with phosphorus oxychloride, it yields a chlorphthalazine, which with zinc and hydrochloric acid gives isoindole (C8H7N), and with tin and hydrochloric acid, phthalimidine (C8H7ON), the second nitrogen atom being eliminated as ammonia.

References

 
Simple aromatic rings